"A Second to Midnight" is a song by Australian singer-songwriter Kylie Minogue and English singer-songwriter Olly Alexander, performing under his solo project Years & Years. The song was released on 6 October 2021. It serves as the lead single of Minogue's reissue album Disco: Guest List Edition, the re-release of her fifteenth studio album Disco (2020). The song is also included on the deluxe version of Years & Years' third studio album Night Call (2022) and featured as the intro music for the Night Call Tour. It marks the second collaboration between Minogue and Alexander following "Starstruck".

Charts

Release history

References

2021 singles
2021 songs
Kylie Minogue songs
Years & Years songs
BMG Rights Management singles
Songs written by Kylie Minogue
Songs written by Olly Alexander
Songs written by Richard Stannard (songwriter)
Songs written by Martin Sjølie